The Big Everything is a 2015 science fiction film directed by Nicolas Bazz.

Plot
In exchange for a full pardon, Niels (Jauris Casanova) joins a group of scientists on a trip to a black hole 50 light years from earth. Because of time dilation, a hundred years will pass on Earth while they are away on their planned six-week journey. However, an accident pushes them even further into space, with no hope of ever returning to their former lives.

Cast 
 Jauris Casanova : Niels
 Hélène Seuzaret : Ariane
 Benjamin Boyer : Sam
 Laure Gouget : Lucie
 Pierre-Alain de Garrigues : Harry

Production

Production design 

The spaceship of the film is very obviously not aerodynamic as it is not made for planetary exploration. It flies through the cosmic void, not through air. In the void there is no resistance and therefore no need for aerodynamics. It is designed for only one purpose, says Nicolas Bazz, interstellar travel, as fast as physically possible.

Visual effects 

Before the shoot even started, Nicolas Bazz  and Yann Bazz, the former as a producer and the latter as VFX supervisor, made a pact. "No more than a hundred VFX shots". After a full day of shooting and trying to avoid the green screens as much as possible, Nicolas Bazz, as director this time, realized the risk of doing a claustrophobic movie. And so the Bazz brothers made a new pact: there will be as few VFX shots as possible... But not one less. 750 is what was needed to tell the story of those characters properly.

The main challenge of greenscreen shooting is neither technical (though it does take forever) nor financial (it's still less expensive than shooting in space). No, the main difficulty is in the acting. More specifically, the “black hole gaze”. Usually visual cues such as ping pong or tennis balls are used to focus the actor’ eyes on their virtual partners.  But no tennis ball can do justice to the wonder, fear and humility such a spectacle should evoke. It takes a lot of discipline and imagination from the actors and absolute accuracy in the direction to pull off. The "black hole gaze" was the focus of many rehearsals, often up until a few seconds before shooting each of those shots.

The director, Nicolas Bazz is usually involved in scouting for locations, but scouting the universe behind a VFX artist's shoulder proved very frustrating. To maintain control over sets and vistas, he asked the VFX supervisor to create a director-friendly interface dubbed “The Universe Engine”. “Space vistas creation” is Nicolas Bazz’ fifth credit on the film.

Science

Black holes 

The black holes of the film aren't holes and they aren't black. The filmmakers chose a very specific type of black holes called Microquasars. The black sphere at the center, also known as the event horizon, is only a part of the whole. The accretion disk is the sum of all the matter the horizon attracts in an ever-accelerating spiral, some of which gets ejected before falling into the horizon, in relativistic particle jets.

Quasar alignment 

Even though The Big Everything is a Hard Sci-Fi movie, using as much real science as possible, some concepts had to be invented. One of those inventions is that quasar class black-holes are aligned with each other, creating a "path" in the universe. To the writer's surprise, it was revealed to be true in 2014, but for as yet unknown reasons. A year later during a public screening, an audience member from the Paris Observatory walked up to the filmmakers during the post-movie debate. He revealed that he and his team had just found out the actual reason for quasar alignment: Dark Matter threads that shape the Universe. The "path" invented for the film has been confirmed by reality.

Details 
 Original title: Le Grand Tout
 Directed by: Nicolas Bazz
 Written by: Nicolas Bazz & Yann Bazz
 Produced by: Ann Barrel, Nicolas Bazz & Yann Bazz
 Music: Christophe Jacquelin
 Cinematography: Jean-Philippe Bourdon
 Set decoration: Christian Baquiast
 Costume design: Fabienne Margolliet
 Makeup department: Zoë vand der Waal
 Country: France
 Genre: Science-Fiction
 Running time: 127 minutes
 Release dates:
 France: September 16; 2015

References 
 The Big Everything in the Top of 2015's movies (fr) from Rue89
 
 « Le Grand Tout », un voyage spatial fantastique en huis clos from Rue89
"Le Grand Tout" a tout pour plaire from Paris Match
Ciel à voir from Le Monde
Le Grand Tout de Nicolas Bazz from Causette
Le Grand Tout : un road movie dans l'univers d'Einstein from Futura-Sciences
Le Grand Tout, de la science fiction made in France au Cinélux from lyonne.fr

French science fiction films
2010s science fiction films
2010s French films